Jasmine Gill (born 7 October 1990 in Greensboro, N. C., United States) is an American professional basketball player. In her career before Torino, she played for Primorje, Partizan, Peli-Karhut, ICIM Arad, Kilsyth LC, Telge Basket, and Sandringham Sabres.

Boston College and James Madison statistics 

Source

References

External links
 Profile at eurobasket.com
 Profile at jmusports.com

1990 births
Basketball players from Greensboro, North Carolina
Living people
American women's basketball players
Shooting guards
ŽKK Partizan players
James Madison Dukes women's basketball players
American expatriate basketball people in Montenegro
American expatriate basketball people in Serbia
American expatriate basketball people in Finland
American expatriate basketball people in Australia
American expatriate basketball people in Greece
American expatriate basketball people in Romania
American expatriate basketball people in Sweden